The 1942 Ohio State Buckeyes football team was an American football team that represented Ohio State University in the Big Ten Conference during the 1942 season. In their second season under head coach Paul Brown, the team compiled a 9–1 record, outscored opponents by a total of 337 to 114, won the Big Ten championship, and was ranked No. 1 in the final AP poll, thus earning the Buckeyes their first AP national championship.

The team was led by wingback Les Horvath, quarterback and team captain George Lynn, and halfback Gene Fekete. Fekete led the Big 10 with 910 rushing yards. 

The Buckeyes' only loss was to No. 3 Wisconsin. Half of the Buckeye players contracted an intestinal disorder after drinking from an unsanitary drinking fountain on the train to Madison. Horvath then led the Buckeyes to three scores through the air to upset Michigan.

Schedule

Coaching staff
 Paul Brown, head coach, second year

Awards

All-Americans
 Charles Csuri, T (Team MVP)
 Gene Fekete, FB
 Lindell Houston, G
 Paul Sarringhaus, HB
 Bob Shaw, E

All-Big Ten
 Lindell Houston, G
 Paul Sarringhaus, HB
 Bob Shaw, E

Big Ten Scholar/Athlete
 Don Steinberg, WR

1943 NFL draftees

References

General

Ohio State
Ohio State Buckeyes football seasons
College football national champions
Big Ten Conference football champion seasons
Ohio State Buckeyes football